Przemysław Kazimierz Gabriel Krompiec (born 3 March 1985) is a Polish male model who performs in South Korea as a television personality and dancer. He is a graduate student of the Chung-Ang University.

Personal life

Education and work in South Korea
In 2004, he studied at the Opole University of Technology, and graduated from the university in 2008. He studied Korean at the Seoul National University Korean Language Education Center. In 2009, he began pursuing his master's degree in Design at University of Ulsan. After graduating, he studied at the Graduate School of Advanced Imaging Science, Multimedia & Film Chung-Ang University. He arrived in South Korea for the first time in 2006. He was accepted to the NIE Program of Polish Government in 2008 and moved to Korea for his studies.

Career
In the summer of 2015 he first appeared on the television program Non-Summit as the Polish representative. On August 5, 2015, National Museum of Korea appointed him as an goodwill ambassador for Polish art exhibition.

Filmography

Television series

References

External links

1985 births
Living people
Polish television personalities
Polish male models
Polish expatriates in South Korea
University of Ulsan alumni
People from Głubczyce County